Lyudmila Iosifovna Makarova (20 October 1921 – 30 May 2014) was a Russian stage actress from Saint Petersburg. From 1938 to 1941, she studied at the Greater Drama Theatre, becoming the theatre's lead actress  under Georgy Tovstonogov.  She is an  best known for roles in performance and television film  Khanuma.

In 1977, she was named a People's Artist of the USSR. Her on-screen appearances were rather brief. She was married to actor Yefim Kopelyan from 1941 until his death in 1975. Their son, Kirill Kopelyan (died 2005), was also an actor.

References

External links

1921 births
2014 deaths
Russian film actresses
Russian stage actresses
Soviet film actresses
Soviet stage actresses
Actresses from Saint Petersburg
People's Artists of the USSR
People's Artists of the RSFSR
Communist Party of the Soviet Union members
Recipients of the Order of Honour (Russia)